tvN (formerly known as Channel M) is a Southeast Asian pay television channel managed by CJ E&M. It broadcasts a variety of South Korean TV series from TV channels operated by CJ E&M (which includes the South Korean channel of the same name, as well as Mnet, OCN and others), with a number of original shows made for the Southeast Asian version.

History
The channel was firstly launched on October 26, 2009 as tvN and was later rebranded as Channel M on November 23, 2012, which serves K-POP and K-Variety. It reverted back to tvN on June 3, 2016, which also carried dramas from CJ E&M's sister channels.

The channel is available in the Philippines, where it is distributed by Creative Programs of ABS-CBN Corporation when their sister cable provider Sky Cable stopped airing the channel in the Philippines starting September 1, 2021. However, it's still available through PLDT's Cignal & Smart GigaPlay.

The channel was closed down in Vietnam on July 2, 2018 (as tvBlue, although the channel has relaunched with contents from other broadcasters).

Programming

References

External links
 

TVN (South Korean TV channel)
Cable television in Hong Kong
Korean-language television stations
Television channels and stations established in 2009